Linda West Eckhardt (born September 29, 1939) is an American culinary writer, author of 18 books, including The Only Texas Cookbook (1981), American Gumbo (1983), Bread In Half The Time (with Diana Butts, 1991), and Entertaining 101 (with Katherine West DeFoyd, 1997).  Her books have won James Beard and Julia Child awards. She was the first food editor of Texas Monthly (1973–). Founder and Editor/Publisher of Everybody Eats News, The Online Newspaper that monitors the sustainable food movement http://www.everybodyeatsnews.com. (2011-), and a contributor to today.com  http://www.today.com.

Biography
Raised in Hereford, Texas, Linda West took a B.S. in foods and nutrition at the University of Texas, and wrote the "Dining In" column for Texas Monthly, while raising a family in Houston.  In the early 1980s she moved to Menlo Park, California, where she completed an M.F.A. in creative writing at San Francisco State University, then to Ashland, Oregon, where she began writing on cooking, dining, and travel, and was a columnist for The Oregonian.  In the late 1990s, she moved to Maplewood, New Jersey, where she has collaborated on several books with her daughter, Katherine West Defoyd.  She is an independent consultant on food and travel.

Published works
The Only Texas Cookbook (in print since 1981)
American Gumbo (later released as Feed Your Family on $10 a day), 1983
The New West Cuisine, 1985
Linda Eckhardt's Guide to America's Best Foods, 1987
Bread in Half the Time, 1991
Rustic European Breads from Your Bread Machine,  1993, second edition 2014
Entertaining 101, 1999
Stylish One Dish Dinners, 2001
Cakes in Half the Time, 2003
The Dog Ate It: Cooking for yourself and your four-legged friends, 2006
 http://www.everybodyeatsnews.com, 2011

Awards
1991: Julia Child Award for Best Book of the Year, International Association of Culinary Professionals, Bread in Half the Time
1998: James Beard Award for Best Entertaining Cookbook, Entertaining 101
1999: James Beard Award nomination for best single subject cookbook "Stylish One dish Dinners"
2001: James Beard award nomination for radio "I know what you ate last summer"  The Food & Wine Radio network
2005: Whose Who in American University Women

References
http://www.texasmonthly.com/authors/lindawesteckhardt
http://www.texasmonthly.com/awards
http://www.amazon.com/Only-Texas-Cookbook-Lone-guides/dp/0877191239/ref=sr_1_3?ie=UTF8&s=books&qid=1230922719&sr=1-3
http://www.amazon.com/Entertaining-101-Linda-West-Eckhardt/dp/0385485425/ref=sr_1_8?ie=UTF8&s=books&qid=1230922719&sr=1-8
http://nl.newsbank.com/nl-search/we/Archives?p_product=SAEC&p_theme=saec&p_action=search&p_maxdocs=200&p_topdoc=1&p_text_direct-0=11392D175F9989E0&p_field_direct-0=document_id&p_perpage=10&p_sort=YMD_date:D&s_trackval=GooglePM
http://select.nytimes.com/gst/abstract.html?res=F70810F7385D0C728EDDA90994D9484D81
http://nl.newsbank.com/nl-search/we/Archives?p_product=NewsLibrary&p_multi=DSNB&d_place=DSNB&p_theme=newslibrary2&p_action=search&p_maxdocs=200&p_topdoc=1&p_text_direct-0=0F3605E6E0919AE8&p_field_direct-0=document_id&p_perpage=10&p_sort=YMD_date:D&s_trackval=GooglePM
HighBeam
https://www.nytimes.com/1991/05/12/books/l-women-and-the-motor-age-863491.html
http://nl.newsbank.com/nl-search/we/Archives?p_product=LB&p_theme=lb&p_action=search&p_maxdocs=200&p_topdoc=1&p_text_direct-0=0EAE8DC2C3EAAA4F&p_field_direct-0=document_id&p_perpage=10&p_sort=YMD_date:D&s_trackval=GooglePM
http://www.amazon.com/Bread-Half-Time-Microwave-Processor/dp/051758154X/ref=sr_1_7?ie=UTF8&s=books&qid=1230922719&sr=1-7

1939 births
Living people
People from Hereford, Texas
American food writers
University of Texas at Austin alumni
Writers from Ashland, Oregon
People from Menlo Park, California
The Oregonian people
Journalists from California
Journalists from Texas
James Beard Foundation Award winners